Leutenbach is a municipality in the Rems-Murr district, in Baden-Württemberg, Germany. It is located 15 km east of Ludwigsburg, and 20 km northeast of Stuttgart.

The footballer Andreas Hinkel, formerly VfB Stuttgart, now Celtic F.C., and also a player for Germany, was born in Backnang, but grew up in Leutenbach. Spree killer Tim Kretschmer grew up and lived in Leutenbach.

Economy and infrastructure

The Stuttgart S-Bahn connects the municipality with Stuttgart.

Transportation
Nellmersbach is a breakpoint at the Waiblingen-Schwäbisch Hall railway.
On this route runs the line S3 (Backnang-Stuttgart Airport ) that connects Nellmersbach in 15- to 30-minute intervals with the state capital.
In September 2009, the new line of Bundesstraße 14 was opened, allowing the western bypass of Winnenden. Therefore,  the over one kilometer long Leutenbachtunnel was built.

Established businesses
HP Kaysser, sheet metal working and processing.

Media
About the local current affairs in Leutenbach reports the daily newspaper Winnender Zeitung.

Education
In all three neighborhoods is located in each case a primary school, in Leutenbach combined with a Werkrealschule. Schools are located in Winnenden and Backnang. There are a total of seven kindergartens.
In Leutenbach is further a branch of the Folk high school Winnenden.

Teams
A detailed list of all Leutenbach clubs can be found on the website of the municipality.

References

External links
 http://www.leutenbach.de/2309_DEU_WWW.php

Rems-Murr-Kreis